Jaime Francisco Mulet Martínez (born 3 August 1963) is a Chilean politician and lawyer.

References

External links
 
 BCN Profile

1963 births
Living people
Chilean people
Pontifical Catholic University of Chile alumni
Christian Democratic Party (Chile) politicians
Independent Regionalist Party politicians
Social Green Regionalist Federation politicians
Deputies of the LV Legislative Period of the National Congress of Chile